Minuscule 379 (in the Gregory-Aland numbering), Zε50 (Soden), is a Greek minuscule manuscript of the New Testament, on paper. Palaeographically it has been assigned to the 15th century. 
It has marginalia.

Description 

The codex contains the text of the four Gospels on 437 paper leaves. The text is written in one column per page, in 27 lines per page. It contains a commentary.

Text 

The Greek text of the codex is a representative of the Byzantine text-type. Aland placed it in Category V.
It was not examined by using the Claremont Profile Method.

History 

The manuscript was added to the list of New Testament manuscripts by Scholz (1794–1852).

C. R. Gregory saw it in 1886.

The manuscript is currently housed at the Vatican Library (Vat. gr. 1769) in Rome.

See also 

 List of New Testament minuscules
 Biblical manuscript
 Textual criticism

References

Further reading 

 

Greek New Testament minuscules
15th-century biblical manuscripts
Manuscripts of the Vatican Library